The 2003 Havant Borough Council election took place on 1 May 2003 to elect members of Havant Borough Council in Hampshire, England. One third of the council was up for election and the Conservative Party stayed in overall control of the council.

After the election, the composition of the council was:
Conservative 23
Labour 8
Liberal Democrats 7

Election result
The Conservative majority on the council was unchanged after they both gained and lost one seat.

Ward results

Bedhampton

Cowplain

Emsworth

Hart Plain

Hayling East

Hayling West

Purbrook

St. Faiths

Stakes

Waterloo

By-elections between 2003 and 2004

References

2003 English local elections
Havant Borough Council elections
2000s in Hampshire